The Summers County Courthouse in Hinton, West Virginia, is a red brick Romanesque Revival or late Victorian building, originally constructed in 1875–76. The building was remodeled between 1893 and 1898 by architect Frank Pierce Milburn, who added octagonal turrets at the corners. A 1923 addition followed suit with another square with two towers. A plan 1930s addition followed. A cast-iron stairway in the northwest tower ascends to the courtroom.

The Putnam County Courthouse uses a similar arrangement of turrets around a square mass.

References

Courthouses on the National Register of Historic Places in West Virginia
Government buildings completed in 1876
County courthouses in West Virginia
Frank Pierce Milburn buildings
Buildings and structures in Summers County, West Virginia
Romanesque Revival architecture in West Virginia
Victorian architecture in West Virginia
Cast-iron architecture in the United States
Historic district contributing properties in West Virginia